Antonino may refer to:

 Antonino (name), a given name and a surname (including a list of people with the name)
 Antonino, Kansas, an unincorporated community in Ellis County, Kansas, United States

See also

 Antoniano (disambiguation)
 Antoñito (disambiguation)
 San Antonino (disambiguation)
 Sant'Antonino (disambiguation)